The 2009 WNBA season is the 13th season for the New York Liberty franchise of the Women's National Basketball Association. The Liberty attempted to advance to the WNBA Playoffs for the tenth time in thirteen seasons, but failed.

Offseason

Dispersal Draft
Based on the Liberty's 2008 record, they would pick 8th in the Houston Comets dispersal draft. The Liberty waived their pick.

WNBA Draft
The following are the Liberty's selections in the 2009 WNBA Draft.

Transactions
June 4: The Liberty waived Jessica Davenport and Lisa Willis.
May 29: The Liberty waived Abby Waner.
May 5: The Liberty acquired Sidney Spencer from the Los Angeles Sparks in exchange for a first round 2010 WNBA Draft pick.
January 12: The Liberty re-signed free agent Cathrine Kraayeveld.
May 7, 2008: The Liberty traded their third-round pick in the 2009 WNBA Draft to the Phoenix Mercury as part of the Leilani Mitchell transaction.

Free agents

Additions

Subtractions

Roster

Season standings

x =Clinched Playoff Spot
e =Eliminated from playoff contention

Schedule

Preseason

|- align="center" bgcolor="bbffbb"
| 1 || May 21 || 11:00am || Washington || 77-71 || Christon (12) || McCarville (5) || Carson (4) || Madison Square Garden  15,958 || 1-0
|- align="center" bgcolor="ffbbbb"
| 2 || May 22 || 7:00pm || @ Connecticut || 62-74 || Davenport (10) || Davenport, Jackson (5) || McCarville, Mitchell, Spencer (3) || Mohegan Sun Arena  5,578 || 1-1
|- align="center" bgcolor="ffbbbb"
| 3 || May 28 || 11:30am || @ Washington || 56-74 || Battle, Carson (9) || Vaughn (7) || Mitchell (2) || Verizon Center  9,287 || 1-2
|-

Regular season

|- align="center" bgcolor="ffbbbb"
| 1 || June 7 || 4:00pm || Connecticut || WCTX || 57-66 || Christon (13) || Kraayeveld (7) || Battle, Mitchell (3) || Madison Square Garden  13,397 || 0-1
|- align="center" bgcolor="ffbbbb"
| 2 || June 10 || 10:00pm || @ Phoenix ||  || 84-91 || Carson (18) || Kraayeveld, Vaughn (7) || McCarville (6) || US Airways Center  5,080 || 0-2
|- align="center" bgcolor="ffbbbb"
| 3 || June 13 || 8:00pm || @ San Antonio || NBA TVMSGKMYS || 60-63 || Christon (21) || McCarville (9) || McCarville, Moore (3) || AT&T Center  10,572 || 0-3
|- align="center" bgcolor="bbffbb"
| 4 || June 19 || 7:30pm || San Antonio || NBA TVMSG || 77-61 || McCarville (18) || Christon, Jackson, McCarville, Moore (6) || Christon (6) || Madison Square Garden  8,046 || 1-3
|- align="center" bgcolor="bbffbb"
| 5 || June 21 || 3:00pm || @ Atlanta ||  || 93-81 || Christon (17) || Moore (8) || Moore (8) || Philips Arena  5,624 || 2-3
|- align="center" bgcolor="ffbbbb"
| 6 || June 23 || 8:00pm || @ Minnesota ||  || 57-69 || Christon (20) || Christon, McCarville (6) || Moore (2) || Target Center  5,620 || 2-4
|- align="center" bgcolor="ffbbbb"
| 7 || June 26 || 7:30pm || Indiana ||  || 81-82 (OT) || Christon (20) || McCarville (9) || Moore (6) || Madison Square Garden  9,304 || 2-5
|- align="center" bgcolor="ffbbbb"
| 8 || June 27 || 7:00pm || @ Indiana || MSG || 54-63 || Carson (14) || Jackson (9) || Moore (3) || Conseco Fieldhouse  8,481 || 2-6
|-

|- align="center" bgcolor="bbffbb"
| 9 || July 2 || 7:30pm || Detroit || MSG || 80-64 || Christon (25) || Kraayeveld (5) || McCarville (5) || Madison Square Garden  8,018 || 3-6
|- align="center" bgcolor="ffbbbb"
| 10 || July 9 || 7:30pm || Los Angeles || MSG || 60-69 || McCarville (18) || McCarville (6) || McCarville (3) || Madison Square Garden  12,247 || 3-7
|- align="center" bgcolor="bbffbb"
| 11 || July 11 || 7:30pm || Atlanta ||  || 71-69 || Christon (18) || McCarville (7) || Moore (6) || Madison Square Garden  8,732 || 4-7
|- align="center" bgcolor="ffbbbb"
| 12 || July 18 || 7:00pm || @ Washington ||  || 67-68 || Christon (21) || Moore (5) || Moore (9) || Verizon Center  9,968 || 4-8
|- align="center" bgcolor="bbffbb"
| 13 || July 19 || 4:00pm || Atlanta ||  || 89-86 || Christon (32) || Christon (8) || Mitchell (6) || Madison Square Garden  8,560 || 5-8
|- align="center" bgcolor="bbffbb"
| 14 || July 22 || 12:30pm || @ Chicago ||  || 77-70 || Spencer (15) || Kraayeveld (8) || Moore (4) || UIC Pavilion  5,881 || 6-8
|- align="center" bgcolor="ffbbbb"
| 15 || July 23 || 7:30pm || Sacramento || MSG || 73-88 || Carson (20) || Carson (5) || Moore (4) || Madison Square Garden  8,845 || 6-9
|- align="center" bgcolor="ffbbbb"
| 16 || July 26 || 4:00pm|| Phoenix ||  || 88-94 || Christon (21) || McCarville (10) || Moore, Spencer (3) || Madison Square Garden  11,211 || 6-10
|- align="center" bgcolor="ffbbbb"
| 17 || July 30 || 7:30pm || Washington || NBA TVMSG || 75-78 || McCarville (28) || McCarville (6) || McCarville, Mitchell, Moore (3) || Madison Square Garden  10,172 || 6-11
|-

|- align="center" bgcolor="ffbbbb"
| 18 || August 1 || 7:00pm || @ Atlanta || NBA TVMSG || 83-89 || Christon (23) || Carson, Christon (8) || McCarville (6) || Philips Arena  6,103 || 6-12
|- align="center" bgcolor="ffbbbb"
| 19 || August 4 || 7:30pm || @ Detroit || ESPN2 || 64-76 || Christon (14) || Christon, Jackson, McCarville (4) || 7 players (1) || Palace of Auburn Hills  7,014 || 6-13
|- align="center" bgcolor="bbffbb"
| 20 || August 7 || 10:00pm || @ Sacramento ||  || 84-66 || McCarville (18) || Jackson (6) || McCarville (5) || ARCO Arena  6,284 || 7-13
|- align="center" bgcolor="ffbbbb"
| 21 || August 8 || 10:00pm || @ Seattle ||  || 69-70 || McCarville (22) || Christon (9) || Moore (5) || KeyArena  7,496 || 7-14
|- align="center" bgcolor="bbffbb"
| 22 || August 11 || 9:00pm || @ Los Angeles || ESPN2 || 65-61 || Christon (11) || Christon, Moore (6) || Christon, Moore (5) || STAPLES Center  9,548 || 8-14
|- align="center" bgcolor="ffbbbb"
| 23 || August 14 || 7:30pm || Chicago || NBA TVMSGCN100 || 77-88 || Christon (25) || Christon (10) || Moore (6) || Madison Square Garden  9,832 || 8-15
|- align="center" bgcolor="bbffbb"
| 24 || August 16 || 4:00pm || @ Washington ||  || 60-59 || McCarville (19) || Kraayeveld (6) || Moore (5) || Verizon Center  10,580 || 9-15
|- align="center" bgcolor="ffbbbb"
| 25 || August 19 || 7:00pm || @ Connecticut ||  || 69-74 || Kraayeveld (13) || McCarville (9) || Mitchell (4) || Mohegan Sun Arena  6,050 || 9-16
|- align="center" bgcolor="bbffbb"
| 26 || August 21 || 7:30pm || Connecticut || NBA TVMSG || 85-83 (OT) || Christon (23) || McCarville (13) || Moore (5) || Madison Square Garden  9,355 || 10-16
|- align="center" bgcolor="bbffbb"
| 27 || August 23 || 4:00pm || Minnesota ||  || 80-67 || Christon (24) || Jackson (7) || Moore (6) || Madison Square Garden  8,481 || 11-16
|- align="center" bgcolor="ffbbbb"
| 28 || August 28 || 8:30pm || @ Chicago || NBA TVMSGCN100 || 77-96 || Jackson (16) || Vaughn (9) || Christon (6) || UIC Pavilion  3,707 || 11-17
|- align="center" bgcolor="bbffbb"
| 29 || August 30 || 4:00pm || Chicago ||  || 77-63 || Christon (18) || Kraayeveld (13) || Moore (5) || Madison Square Garden  8,685 || 12-17
|-

|- align="center" bgcolor="ffbbbb"
| 30 || September 1 || 7:30pm || Seattle ||  || 58-65 || Kraayeveld (14) || Kraayeveld (9) || Moore (4) || Madison Square Garden  8,469 || 12-18
|- align="center" bgcolor="ffbbbb"
| 31 || September 4 || 7:00pm || @ Connecticut || NBA TVMSG || 85-88 (OT) || Christon (22) || Moore (8) || Moore (4) || Mohegan Sun Arena  6,685 || 12-19
|- align="center" bgcolor="ffbbbb"
| 32 || September 8 || 7:30pm || Indiana ||  || 63-69 || Carson (17) || Larkins, Mitchell (6) || Mitchell (6) || Madison Square Garden  7,583 || 12-20
|- align="center" bgcolor="ffbbbb"
| 33 || September 10 || 7:30pm || @ Detroit  || NBA TVMSG || 87-94 (OT) || Carson (28) || Battle, Vaughn (4) || Moore (6) || Palace of Auburn Hills  8,178 || 12-21
|- align="center" bgcolor="bbffbb"
| 34 || September 13 || 4:00pm || Washington || MSG || 86-65 || Carson (17) || Jackson, Kraayeveld (5) || Mitchell (6) || Madison Square Garden  15,667 || 13-21
|-

| All games are viewable on WNBA LiveAccess

Regular Season Statistics

Player Statistics

Team Statistics

Awards and honors
Shameka Christon was named WNBA Eastern Conference Player of the Week for the week of July 13, 2009.
Shameka Christon was named to the 2009 WNBA All-Star Team as an Eastern Conference reserve.
July 25, 2009: Teresa Weatherspoon, who led the New York Liberty to three WNBA finals, will be inducted into the Women's Basketball Hall of Fame, leading a class of six inductees.

References

External links
Official Site

New York Liberty seasons
New York
New York Liberty